Vincent Dias Dos Santos (born ) is a Luxembourgish cyclo-cross cyclist. He represented his nation in the men's elite event at the 2016 UCI Cyclo-cross World Championships.

Major results
2007–2008
 1st  Junior National Cyclo-cross Championships
2014–2015
 3rd National Cyclo-cross Championships
2017–2018
 3rd National Cyclo-cross Championships
2018–2019
 1st  National Cyclo-cross Championships

References

External links
 Profile at cyclingarchives.com

1990 births
Living people
Cyclo-cross cyclists
Luxembourgian male cyclists
Place of birth missing (living people)